Mary Lightbody (born July 17, 1952) is an American educator and politician who is the member of the Ohio House of Representatives from the 4th district in Franklin County.

Lightbody was a Senior Lecturer in the Department of Education at the Ohio State University, Newark Campus and previously taught at Otterbein University.

Ohio House of Representatives

Election
Lightbody was elected in the general election on November 6, 2018, winning 55 percent of the vote over 45 percent of Republican candidate Tim Barhorst, flipping the seat from Republican control to Democratic control.

Committees
Lightbody serves on the following committees: Agriculture and Rural Development, Commerce and Labor, and Higher Education.

Election history

References

Ohio State University faculty
Democratic Party members of the Ohio House of Representatives
Living people
21st-century American politicians
21st-century American women politicians
Women state legislators in Ohio
1952 births
Harvard College alumni
Ohio State University College of Education and Human Ecology alumni
Otterbein University faculty
American women academics